Esporte Clube Taveirópolis, commonly known as Taveirópolis, is Brazilian football club based in Campo Grande, Mato Grosso do Sul state. They competed in the Série C once.

History
The club was founded on June 30, 1938, in Taveirópolis neighborhood. They competed in the Série C in 2003, when they were eliminated in the First Stage of the competition.

Stadium
Esporte Clube Taveirópolis play their home games at Estádio Elias Gadia. The stadium has a maximum capacity of 3,000 people.

References

Association football clubs established in 1938
Football clubs in Mato Grosso do Sul
1938 establishments in Brazil